Over The Black Dot is an Indigenous-orientated rugby league program that airs on NITV. The show primarily features discussion and highlights of National Rugby League matches, with a particular focus on Indigenous players and their stories and performances. Hosted by Jodan Perry and featuring analysis from former NRL star Dean Widders and touch football world champion Bo De La Cruz, the program airs at 8:35pm every Wednesday.

Format
The format of Over The Black Dot features highlights and discussion of the previous week's NRL matches, followed by interviews with players and then a preview of the following week's games. The show runs for 60 minutes including advertisements.

References

External links

2017 Australian television series debuts
2000s Australian television series
English-language television shows
Australian sports television series
Rugby league television shows
National Rugby League
National Indigenous Television original programming